{{DISPLAYTITLE:C38H42N2O6}}
The molecular formula C38H42N2O6 (molar mass : 622.74 g/mol) may refer to : 

 Cycleanine, a selective vascular calcium antagonist
 Rodiasine, an alkaloid
 Tetrandrine, a calcium channel blocker